USS Vermillion (CVE-52) (previously AVG-52 then later ACV-52) was laid down on 10 May 1943 by the Seattle-Tacoma Shipbuilding Corporation as a  auxiliary aircraft carrier; redesignated an escort aircraft carrier, on 10 June 1943; assigned to the United Kingdom under Lend-Lease on 23 June 1943; launched on 27 September 1943; and accepted by Britain on 20 January 1944.

Service history
She returned to the United States at Norfolk Naval Base, Virginia on 20 March 1946 and was officially transferred back to the United States Navy on 6 April 1946. She was immediately determined to be surplus to the needs of the Navy and was designated for sale. Her name was struck from the Navy Registry on 6 May 1946.

On 28 January 1947, she was sold to the Newport News Shipbuilding and Drydock Company, Norfolk, Virginia, for conversion to mercantile service. She was subsequently resold to Compania Argentina de Navigacion Dodero, S.A., and entered mercantile service in 1948 at Buenos Aires as SS Artillero (renamed President Garcia in 1965). She was wrecked off Guernsey in July 1967, deemed a total loss and was scrapped at Hamburg in November of the same year.

Design and description
These ships were all larger and had a greater aircraft capacity than all the preceding American built escort carriers. They were also all laid down as escort carriers and not converted merchant ships.

Armament comprised: two 4"/50, 5"/38 or 5"/51 Dual Purpose guns in single mounts, sixteen 40 mm Bofors anti-aircraft guns in twin mounts and twenty 20 mm Oerlikon anti-aircraft cannon in single mounts. They had a maximum aircraft capacity of twenty-four aircraft which could be a mixture of Grumman Martlet, Vought F4U Corsair or Hawker Sea Hurricane fighter aircraft and Fairey Swordfish or Grumman Avenger anti-submarine aircraft.

Notes

References

External links
 history.navy.mil: USS Vermillion
 navsource.org: USS Vermillion (CVE-52) / HMS Smiter
 hazegray.org: USS Vermillion

 

Ruler-class escort carriers
Ships built in Tacoma, Washington
 
1943 ships